Hilary Shepard (born Hilary Shapiro on December 10, 1959), alternately billed as Hilary Shepard-Turner, is an American actress and singer. She began her career in the mid 1980s, as co-lead singer and percussionist in the girl group American Girls, while also starting to appear in small roles in film and on television. Her film and television career expanded with larger roles in numerous series and films. She may be best known for her recurring role as the evil pirate queen Divatox in Power Rangers Turbo and Turbo: A Power Rangers Movie, as well as the genetically enhanced Lauren in two episodes of Star Trek: Deep Space Nine.

Biography
Shepard was born in New York City, New York. In the mid-1980s, Shepard was a co-lead singer and percussionist in the short-lived all-female group American Girls. American Girls originally started as a film project, which fizzled. After some personnel changes and more rehearsing, the band sustained many comparisons to the Go-Go's, who were popular at the time as well assigned to the same label, IRS Records. However, American Girls featured veterans of the all-women band scene including Brie Howard who had played drums for Fanny and Miiko Watanabe who played bass with the Screamin' Sirens. They recorded one album only, which was intended as a demo but was pressed to vinyl in its original form. The eponymous debut album was released in March 1986.  The cover shows the band in a hotel room, with alcohol, a deck of cards, and a copy of The National Enquirer. The video for their single "American Girl" received some airplay on MTV. Their song "Androgynous" appeared in the 1986 film Tough Guys and the song "American Girl" appeared on the soundtrack for Out of Bounds.  They also opened for The Lords of the New Church on 1986 tour dates.

When that group ended, she moved into acting, appearing in numerous motion picture and television series.

Career
Shepard's film career includes: Summer Lovers (1982), Weekend Pass (1984), Private Resort (1985), Radioactive Dreams (1985), Tough Guys (1986), Hunk (1987), Lucky Stiff (1988), Troop Beverly Hills (1989), Peacemaker (1990), Scanner Cop (1994), Turbo: A Power Rangers Movie (1997), The 40-Year-Old Virgin (2005), and Going Shopping (2005).

In 1992, she guest-starred in two episodes of Full House'''s sixth season as KFLH D.J. Julie in "Radio Days" and "Lovers And Other Tanners". In 1994, she played Zena in the film Scanner Cop.

She has appeared as a guest star in several other television series, including The Golden Girls, Full House, Roswell, So Little Time, Crossing Jordan and CSI: Crime Scene Investigation. Shepard may be best known for her recurring role as the evil pirate queen, Divatox, in the Power Rangers franchise, starting with Turbo: A Power Rangers Movie. During the first half of the Power Rangers Turbo season, Shepard was replaced by actress Carol Hoyt in the role of Divatox while she was on maternity leave. 

In 1996, she portrayed two characters on Star Trek: Deep Space Nine: the Benzite ensign Hoya in “The Ship” and the genetically enhanced Lauren in "Statistical Probabilities" and "Chrysalis". Her 1996 film, Theodore Rex starring Whoopi Goldberg, was originally intended for theatrical release; the film went direct-to-video, and consequently became the most expensive direct-to-video film ever made at the time of its release.

In 1998, she starred in the TV movie Addams Family Reunion, alongside Tim Curry, Daryl Hannah, Haylie Duff and Ed Begley Jr. Only released on VHS and LaserDisc, the film has never been released on DVD.

Shepard portrayed the lead villain, the chain-smoking Virginia Svelte, in Jurgen Vsych's 2001 film Ophelia Learns to Swim.

In 2017, she was cast in the short film The Order, alongside other former Power Rangers cast members.The Order movie science fiction.com

In 2018, she acted in the Netflix musical film Paradox, the directorial debut of her friend, actress Daryl Hannah.

Others
Shepard and actress Daryl Hannah co-created two board games, "Love It or Hate It" and "LIEbrary,"Erik Arneson. Daryl Hannah designs board game, Liebrary was co-designed by actress Hilary Shepard. About.com. Retrieved 28 April 2006. the latter having been previewed by Hannah on The Ellen DeGeneres Show'' in December 2005.

References

External links

1959 births
American film actresses
American television actresses
American voice actresses
American video game actresses
Actresses from New York City
Lee Strasberg Theatre and Film Institute alumni
Living people
American Girls (band) members
Board game designers
21st-century American women